Polina Neykova (born October 7, 1998 in Etropole, Bulgaria) is a volleyball player from Bulgaria. She has been a member of the country's U18, U20, U23 and senior national teams. 

She competed at the 2021 Women's European Volleyball League, winning a gold medal.

At club level, she played as a setter for VC CSKA Sofia from 2016 to 2020. and for Panathinaikos during the 2020-21 season.

References

External links
 profile at CEV website, cev.lu
 profile at FIVB Volleyball Women's U20 World Championship 2017 website

1998 births
Living people
Panathinaikos Women's Volleyball players
Bulgarian women's volleyball players